KWWT (channel 30) is a television station licensed to Odessa, Texas, United States, serving the Permian Basin area as an affiliate of MyNetworkTV. It is owned by Gray Television alongside CBS affiliate KOSA-TV (channel 7, also licensed to Odessa), Big Spring–licensed CW+ affiliate KCWO-TV (channel 4), Telemundo affiliate KTLE-LD (channel 7.5) and Antenna TV affiliate KMDF-LD (channel 22). The five stations share studios inside the Music City Mall on East 42nd Street in Odessa, with a secondary studio and news bureau in downtown Midland; KWWT's transmitter is located on SH 158 near Gardendale, Texas.

History

KWWT signed on the air on December 5, 2001, as KPXK. It was a Pax TV affiliate until late 2005, when KWWT moved its cable-only The WB 100+ feed (which was established on September 21, 1998) to UHF channel 30.

On January 24, 2006, CBS Corporation and the Warner Bros. unit of Time Warner announced the shutdown of both UPN and The WB effective that fall. In place of these two networks, a new "fifth" network—"The CW Television Network" (its name representing the first initials of parent companies CBS and Warner Bros.), jointly owned by both companies, would launch, with a lineup primarily featuring the most popular programs from both networks. In March 2006 it was announced that KWWT would be a CW affiliate through The CW Plus.

In 2011, KWWT signed on to carry college football and basketball games from the Southland Conference Television Network. The contract continues today. For the first 3 seasons the games usually aired on 30.2, though they will likely move to 30.1 for the 2014 season. Additionally, KWWT aired ACC Network basketball games during the 2011–12 basketball season.

KWWT remained a CW affiliate until December 29, 2013. On that date, KWES-TV (channel 9) took over CW rights and KWWT moved MeTV to 30.1 while adding Movies! on 30.2.

On July 24, 2020, it was announced that Gray Television (owner of CBS affiliate KOSA-TV and CW affiliate KCWO-TV) would purchase KWWT and sister low-power station KMDF-LD for $1.84 million, pending approval of the Federal Communications Commission (FCC). Gray sought a failing station waiver as the Odessa–Midland market would not have at least eight independent voices after the transaction (KCWO-TV is licensed as a satellite of KOSA-TV despite airing different programming). In addition, Gray also announced that after the sale, KWWT would move its operations to the shared KOSA/KCWO facility in Odessa. The FCC granted the waiver on September 14. The sale was completed on September 30.

Technical information

Subchannels
The station's digital signal is multiplexed:

Analog-to-digital conversion
KWWT shut down its analog signal, over UHF channel 30, on June 12, 2009, and "flash-cut" its digital signal into operation on its analog-era UHF channel 30. Because it was granted an original construction permit after the FCC finalized the digital television transition in the United States (DTV) allotment plan on April 21, 1997, the station did not receive a companion channel for a digital television station.

See also
Channel 5 branded TV stations in the United States 
Channel 14 branded TV stations in the United States 
Channel 16 branded TV stations in the United States 
Channel 30 digital TV stations in the United States
Channel 30 virtual TV stations in the United States

References

External links

Television channels and stations established in 2001
2001 establishments in Texas
WWT
MyNetworkTV affiliates
MeTV affiliates
Decades (TV network) affiliates
Movies! affiliates
Cozi TV affiliates
Defy TV affiliates
Gray Television